is a Japanese manga series written and illustrated by Tsuyoshi Yasuda. It has been serialized in Kodansha's shōnen manga magazine Weekly Shōnen Magazine since October 2021.

Publication
Written and illustrated by Tsuyoshi Yasuda, Ao no Miburo started in Kodansha's shōnen manga magazine Weekly Shōnen Magazine on October 13, 2021. Kodansha has collected its chapters into individual tankōbon volumes. The first volume was released on February 17, 2022. As of February 17, 2023, seven volumes have been released.

Volume list

References

External links
  

Historical anime and manga
Kodansha manga
Shōnen manga